John Hamilton Morgan (August 8, 1842 – August 14, 1894), was an early educator in Utah Territory, an official of the Church of Jesus Christ of Latter-day Saints (LDS Church), and a politician.

Biography
Morgan was born in Greensburg, Decatur County, Indiana, and served as a sergeant in the Union Army in the 123rd Illinois Volunteer Infantry Regiment during the American Civil War. After the war he enrolled in Eastman's Commercial College in Poughkeepsie, New York. After graduation, he traveled to Salt Lake City on business, and decided to permanently relocate there.

In 1867 Morgan established the Morgan Commercial College in Salt Lake City, where he tapped a strong interest in business education. He moved the school into larger accommodations several times as enrollment increased. The college provided a number of innovations, including Utah's first free public library, and the first school run by a non-Mormon. The college taught many students that would later rise to prominence in Utah, including Heber J. Grant, Orson F. Whitney, Matthias F. Cowley, and J. Golden Kimball. The college lasted until 1874, when it closed due to intense competition from the University of Deseret (which later became the University of Utah). Although the University of Deseret was founded in 1850, it had been put in a 16-year hiatus until Morgan's success inspired its comeback.

On November 26, 1867, Morgan joined the LDS Church and on October 24, 1868 he married one of his former students, Helen Melvina Groesbeck. After the college closed in 1874, Morgan served as a missionary in the Southern States Mission from 1875 to 1877, returning to the mission again in 1878 to become the mission president. During his term as mission president he was involved with attempts to help the Catawba tribe move to the west to be with the rest of the Saints.  On October 8, 1884 he became one of the seven presidents of the Quorums of the Seventy, filling the vacancy created by the death of William W. Taylor, son of church president John Taylor. Morgan served as a general authority for the last 10 years of his life.

Morgan also became involved in Utah politics, and served a term as a representative to the Utah Territorial Legislature as a Republican in 1883.

Morgan died unexpectedly from typhoid-malaria after a two-week convalescence in Preston, Idaho. He was a practicing polygamist, and all four wives outlived him.He was arrested on polygamy charges while visiting one of his wives in Manassa, Colorado. One of his widows, Mary Ann Linton (Morgan) was remarried to David King Udall.

See also
 The Church of Jesus Christ of Latter-day Saints in Georgia (U.S. state)

References

Further reading

 — includes details described by Morgan of the difficult conditions found in the Southern States Mission

External links
Grampa Bill's General Authority Pages
John Hamilton Morgan Papers at the University of Utah
John Hamilton Morgan photos
 John Hamilton Morgan Papers at University of Utah Digital Library, Marriott Library Special Collections

1842 births
1894 deaths
19th-century American politicians
19th-century Mormon missionaries
American Mormon missionaries in the United States
American general authorities (LDS Church)
Burials at Salt Lake City Cemetery
Counselors in the General Presidency of the Sunday School (LDS Church)
Deaths from malaria
Deaths from typhoid fever
Infectious disease deaths in Idaho
Latter Day Saints from Indiana
Latter Day Saints from Utah
Members of the Utah Territorial Legislature
Mission presidents (LDS Church)
People from Greensburg, Indiana
Presidents of the Seventy (LDS Church)
Union Army soldiers
Utah Republicans
Founders of schools in the United States
19th-century American educators
Heads of universities and colleges in the United States
General authority seventies (LDS Church)